SS Straßburg was a German association football club from the city of Straßburg, Elsass (today Strasbourg, Alsace in France).

The team was founded in 1900 as FC Frankonia 1900 Straßburg (after Franconia) when the region was under German control. Following the end of World War I the territory of Alsace was returned to France and the team became part of that country's competition as Sport-Club Red-Star Straßbourg. In August 1940, after the Nazi conquest of the province, Frankonia collapsed, but was immediately re-constituted out of its former membership as Sportgemeinschaft Schutzstaffel Straßburg in September.

The formation of military clubs was common in Germany at the time, but the creation of an SS side required the permission of Schutzstaffel head Heinrich Himmler. SG became part of the Gauliga Unterelsass, a regional first division established in the territory of Elsass, without having to first qualify. The side was quickly strengthened by the addition of other SS members who were required to leave behind their original clubs to don the white and black kit bearing the SS rune as a crest.

In their second season, in what had since become the Gauliga Elsaß, SG easily won the division and advanced through the national playoffs to the quarterfinals, where they were put out by eventual champions FC Schalke 04, who emerged as the dominant side of the era. They also took part in the 1942 Tschammerpokal tournament, predecessor to today's DFB-Pokal (German Cup), and went as far as the third round before being crushed 1:15 by TSV 1860 München on their way to a cup triumph. Their turn in the national playoffs was the highpoint of the Straßburg side's history; they could earn only third and second-place results in their next two campaigns. Play in the Gauliga Unterelsass never got underway in the 1944–45 season as Allied armies began their advance through Europe and into Germany, with SG disappearing in 1944.

Honours
 Gauliga Elsaß (I) champions: 1942

References
Das deutsche Fußball-Archiv historical German domestic league tables (in German)

Football clubs in Strasbourg
Defunct football clubs in former German territories
Association football clubs established in 1900
Association football clubs disestablished in 1944
Nazi SS
Military association football clubs in Germany
History of Strasbourg
1900 establishments in Germany
1944 disestablishments in Germany
Defunct football clubs in France